Louis L. Huntley (January 8, 1928 – July 12, 2006) was an American politician. He served as a Democratic member of the Florida House of Representatives.

Life and career 
Huntley was born in Clay County, Florida, the son of Edith Lillian Hill and Frank T. Huntley. He attended Clay County High School and the University of Florida.

In 1965, Huntley was elected to the Florida House of Representatives, serving until 1966.

Huntley died in July 2006, at the age of 78.

References 

1928 births
2006 deaths
People from Clay County, Florida
Democratic Party members of the Florida House of Representatives
20th-century American politicians
University of Florida alumni